Gaza Marine is a natural gas field off the coast of the Gaza Strip. The field was discovered in 2000 by BG Group, but as of 2021 its exploitation is still subject to negotiations.

History
In 1999, BG Group was granted an exploration licence by the Palestinian National Authority, and in 2000, BG Group discovered the Gaza Marine gas field. The field has enough natural gas to supply the Palestinian territories and still have a surplus for export, making the Palestinian territories more energy independent.

Despite many attempts to strike a deal with BG to open the Gaza Marine gas field, it is still unexploited. Two of the main parties involved in the negotiations are the Israel Electric Corporation (IEC) and Egypt, who seek to convert the natural gas into liquefied natural gas to export. The gas field remains unexploited for political and historical reasons although when it was first discovered the media coverage projected it to be a subject which could lead to cooperation and negotiation between Israel and the Palestinians, offering benefits to both parties.

Ownership and access disputes
Israel and the Palestinian territories are situated in close proximity to several other countries: Lebanon and Syria are to the north, while Cyprus, an island that rests nearby in the Mediterranean Sea, is to the west just below Turkey. To the south is Egypt, a major energy supplier to Israel. The gas fields that lie under the Mediterranean do not conform to national borders. Lebanon and Egypt objected to Israel's claims to certain gas fields. And Israel has tightened ties with Cyprus over gas field negotiations. Regionally, the discovery of gas fields has led to increased tension between these closely placed countries.

Maritime law and Israeli occupation of the Palestinian territories also complicated the question of who owns the Gaza Marine gas field. Although they are legally under the jurisdiction of the Palestinian Authority as a result of the Oslo Accords, Israeli forces have prevented Palestinians physical access to the resources available offshore.

References

Natural gas fields in the State of Palestine
Economy of the Gaza Strip